Károly Szabó (5 July 1928 – 25 July 1995) was a Hungarian diplomat, who served as Hungarian Ambassador to the United States between 1971 and 1975.

Prior to that, he was also Ambassador to Tanzania from 1967 to 1969, also accredited to Somalia and Zambia. From 1979 to 1984, he functioned as Ambassador to Mexico, also accredited to Costa Rica, Honduras, Panama, Jamaica, Trinidad and Tobago and Barbados. From 1984 to 1986, he was head of 8th Regional Department (Sub-Saharan Africa) of the Hungarian Foreign Service. He retired on 30 June 1986.

References

Sources

External links
 Diplomatic Representation for Hungary

1928 births
1995 deaths
Ambassadors of Hungary to Barbados
Ambassadors of Hungary to the United States
Ambassadors of Hungary to Mexico
People from Miskolc
Ambassadors of Hungary to Tanzania